Radhia Haddad (March 17, 1922 – October 20, 2003) was a Tunisian feminist activist, and former chairperson of the National Union of Tunisian Women for fifteen years.

Biography
Born Radhia Ben Ammar on March 17, 1922, she was the daughter of Salah Ben Ammar. She grew up in a family of traditional Tunisian bourgeoisie intellectuals. She had her primary studies in French at the French School of Franceville, but, as a girl, she was forced by her parents to leave school at twelve years old after obtaining her primary school certificate. She later wrote that priority in education was given to the males in her family:  complaining that "no sacrifice was deemed too great to facilitate the studies of my brothers". 

Nevertheless, she pursued Arabic language courses at home and learned a lot from her brother, the future politician and activist for human rights Hassib Ben Ammar, with whom she often discussed reading his college books. Radhia Haddad, compelled to wear the traditional Tunisian dressing of the face veil, revolted and refused to leave the house. She took advantage of house calls made to their house by the family doctor, Abderhaman Mami, whenever someone fell ill, to discuss political activities of the Destour and Neo-Destour political parties in Tunisia.

References

External links 

Tunisian politicians
Tunisian women
Tunisian feminists